Michael Katz may refer to:

 Michael Katz (journalist) (born 1939), American sportswriter
 Michael Katz (producer) (born 1954), Austrian film producer 
 Michael Katz (chef), Israeli chef and food writer
 Michael B. Katz (1939–2014), American historian, Social Science Research Council 
 Michael R. Katz, translator of Russian literature (Antonina and others)

See also 
 Mike Katz (born 1944), American bodybuilder